Caroline Adelaide Shaw (born August 1, 1982) is an American composer of contemporary classical music, violinist, and singer. She is best known for the a cappella piece Partita for 8 Voices, for which she won the 2013 Pulitzer Prize for Music. Shaw received the 2022 Grammy Award for Best Contemporary Classical Composition for her Narrow Sea.

Early life
Caroline Adelaide Shaw was born on August 1, 1982 in Greenville, North Carolina, U.S. At two years old she began playing the violin, being initially taught the Suzuki method by her mother Jon, a violinist and singer. Early influences included the choir of her local Episcopal church and the organist there who frequently played Bach. NPR's Elena Saavedra Buckley notes that Shaw's "personal place of worship was in front of her Sony boombox radio. She would call into the classical station and request a piece — a duet from The Magic Flute, say — and get ready to record it on cassette when it came on. If they aired the wrong duet, she would call back and correct them." She began writing music when she was 10 years old, mostly in imitation of the chamber music of Mozart and Brahms.

At university, her main focus was on violin performance, aiming to become an orchestral or chamber musician. Shaw received her Bachelor of Music (violin performance) from Rice University in 2004, and her master's degree (violin) from Yale University in 2007. She entered the PhD program in composition in Princeton University in 2010.

Career 
At 30, Shaw became the youngest recipient of the Pulitzer Prize for Music for her composition Partita for 8 Voices.  The jury citation praised the composition as "a highly polished and inventive a cappella work uniquely embracing speech, whispers, sighs, murmurs, wordless melodies and novel vocal effects." The work comprises four movements inspired by baroque dance forms: Allemande, Sarabande, Courante and Passacaglia. A recording of the work was released by New Amsterdam Records on October 30, 2012, performed by the ensemble Roomful of Teeth (including Shaw). According to Steven Mackey, chair of the Department of Music at Princeton, this is the first Pulitzer Prize awarded to a member of the department. (Milton Babbitt was awarded a Pulitzer citation in 1982 for his life's work as a composer.)

Besides composition, Shaw is known as a musician appearing in many guises. She performs primarily as violinist with the American Contemporary Music Ensemble (ACME) and as vocalist with Roomful of Teeth. She also works with the Trinity Wall Street Choir, Alarm Will Sound, Wordless Music Orchestra, Ensemble Signal, AXIOM, The Yehudim, Victoire, Opera Cabal, the Mark Morris Dance Group Ensemble, Hotel Elefant, the Oracle Hysterical, Red Light New Music, and Robert Mealy's Yale Baroque Ensemble.

Her works have been performed by Roomful of Teeth, So Percussion, ACME, the Brentano String Quartet, yMusic, and the Brooklyn Youth Chorus. Shaw has been a Yale Baroque Ensemble fellow and a Rice University Goliard fellow. She received the Thomas J. Watson Fellowship in 2004/5.

Shaw was the musician in residence at Dumbarton Oaks during the fall of 2014, and was composer in residence with Music on Main in Vancouver, British Columbia, Canada through 2016, and she has said that The Evergreen was inspired by a particular tree in Bluffs Park, Galiano Island.

In October 2015, rapper Kanye West released a remix of "Say You Will", the opening track from his 2008 album, 808s & Heartbreak. The remix, co-produced by Caroline Shaw, features vocals from Shaw similar to her classical compositions. She also features on "Wolves" and contributed vocals to "Father Stretch My Hands Pt. 2", both from West's 7th studio album, The Life of Pablo. Shaw also contributed vocals to a leaked version of "Only One" that appeared on the internet in February 2016.

Shaw appeared as herself in season 4 of the Amazon Prime series Mozart in the Jungle, for a story line that involved a main character seeking to premiere her piece "Hi" in a competition for conductors. The piece was also played live at the series' release party, with Shaw conducting.

Music

In 2016, the Baltimore Symphony Orchestra commissioned and premiered Shaw's The Baltimore Bomb as part of the orchestra's bicentennial celebration.

She composed the music for Josephine Decker's 2018 feature film, Madeline’s Madeline.

In 2018, the British Broadcasting Corporation with Coretet, the Philips Collection, the Royal Philharmonic Society and the University of Delaware commissioned Shaw to write two works, Second Essay, Echo and Third Essay: Ruby. These received their world premiere, performed by the Calidore String Quartet, at the Cadogan Hall, London on July 16, 2018, in the BBC Proms, where they followed her 2016 work First Essay, Nimrod. According to Shaw, Nimrod was composed while listening to a recording of Marilynne Robinson's book The Givenness of Things and then in the 2016 US presidential election, which she stated accounted for the "disintegration of elements" in the piece. Shaw stated that Echo alluded to the 'echo' function in the PHP programming language, as well as to physical echoes, while Ruby is named for the Ruby programming language as well as for the gemstone.

In October 2019, several performers of katajjaq, including Canadian Inuk throat singer Tanya Tagaq, accused Caroline Shaw and Roomful of Teeth of having engaged in cultural appropriation and exoticism for the perceived uncredited quotation of a katajjaq song in the third movement of Partita. In a public statement released by Caroline Shaw and artistic director Brad Wells, Roomful of Teeth acknowledged that they had hired and studied with Inuit singers in 2010 and that techniques learned from those studies had been used in Partita; they further stated that they believed those "patterns to be sufficiently distinct from katajjaq".

Discography

Featured artist

Guest appearances

References

Notes

Citations

Sources
Books

 

Articles

 
 
  
 

Web

Further reading

External links 
 

1982 births
Living people
21st-century American composers
21st-century American violinists
21st-century American women musicians
21st-century classical composers
21st-century classical violinists
21st-century women composers
American classical violinists
American people of Chinese descent
American people of Thai descent
American women classical composers
American classical composers
Grammy Award winners
People from Greenville, North Carolina
Princeton University alumni
Pulitzer Prize for Music winners
Rice University alumni
Women classical violinists
Women in classical music
Yale University alumni